Canada competed at the 1980 Winter Olympics in Lake Placid, United States. Canada had competed at every Winter Olympic Games previously.

Medalists

Alpine skiing

Men

Women

Bobsleigh

Cross-country skiing

Women

Women's 4 × 5 km relay

Figure skating

Men

Women

Pairs

Ice Dancing

Ice hockey

First Round - Red Division

All times are local (UTC-5).

Consolation round
The third-placed teams in each division, Czechoslovakia and Canada, played each other to determine fifth place.

Final Rank: 6th place

Team Roster
 Bob Dupuis
 Paul Pageau
 Warren Anderson
 Joe Grant
 Randy Gregg
 Terry O'Malley
 Brad Pirie
 Don Spring
 Tim Watters
 Glenn Anderson
 Ken Berry
 Dan D'Alvise
 Ron Davidson
 John Devaney
 Dave Hindmarch
 Paul MacLean
 Kevin Maxwell
 Jim Nill
 Kevin Primeau
 Stelio Zupancich
 Franco Carella (practised from 1976–1980)
Head coaches: Lorne Davis, Clare Drake & Tom Watt

Luge

Men

Women

Ski jumping

Speed skating

Men

Women

References

 Olympic Winter Games 1980, full results by sports-reference.com

Nations at the 1980 Winter Olympics
1980
Winter Olympics